Lindenau is an unincorporated community in DeWitt County, in the U.S. state of Texas.

History
Lindenau was founded in 1891 The community was originally built up chiefly by Germans. A post office was established at Lindenau in 1895, and remained in operation until 1947.

References

Unincorporated communities in DeWitt County, Texas
Unincorporated communities in Texas